Static is the third studio album by Highland Park, California heavy metal band Huntress. It was released on September 25, 2015. The album title, track listing and cover were announced on June 15, with an audio snippet of the song "Flesh".

A lyric video for the song "Flesh" was released on July 31, 2015. A music video for the song "Sorrow" was released on September 25, 2015.

This is the final album recorded with singer Jill Janus before she committed suicide on August 14, 2018.

Track listing
Music by Huntress.  Lyrics by Jill Janus.

Personnel
Huntress
Jill Janus – vocals 
Blake Meahl – lead guitar, bass
Eli Santana – rhythm guitar
Tyler Meahl – drums

Production
Paul Fig – production, engineering, mixing
Jim Rota – production
Gene Grimaldi - mastering
Vance Kelly – artwork and layout

References

2015 albums
Huntress (band) albums
Napalm Records albums